I'm OK is Taiwanese Mandopop singer-songwriter David Tao's second Mandarin studio album. It was released on 10 December 1999 by Shok Records.

The album was nominated as the Best Mandarin Album, won the Best Album Producer and the track "找自己" (Rain) was nominated for Best Music Video, Best Composer and Best Arrangement at the 11th Golden Melody Awards, Taiwan in 2000.

The tracks "普通朋友" (Regular Friends) and "找自己" (Rain) are listed at number 8 and 44 respectively on Hit Fm Taiwan's Hit Fm Annual Top 100 Singles Chart (Hit-Fm年度百首單曲) for 2000.

Track listing

Awards

References

External links
  David Tao@Gold Typhoon formerly EMI Music Taiwan

David Tao albums
1999 albums